Moment of Truth is the fifth album by hip hop duo Gang Starr, released on March 31, 1998 by Noo Trybe Records and Virgin Records. Gang Starr recorded Moment of Truth in sessions at D&D Studios. It is widely regarded as Gang Starr's magnum opus, and one of the greatest hip hop albums of all time.

Commercial performance
The album is the group's most commercially successful album to date. Moment of Truth debuted at #1 on the Top R&B/Hip Hop Albums chart. The album sold 97,000 copies in its first week. It went on to sell over 500,000 copies and was certified Gold by the RIAA on May 7, 1998. The lead single, "You Know My Steez," became the duo's second Billboard Hot 100 appearance in 1997, peaking at #76. Spin magazine ranked it as the #16 album of 1998. Pitchfork also ranked it as the 16th best album of 1998.

In popular culture
The album's title track was featured in the 2011 Matthew McConaughey film The Lincoln Lawyer. The title track also appeared in the soundtrack of the 2001 video game Dave Mirra Freestyle BMX 2 as well as an episode during the third season of the television show Mr. Robot. The song Work appears on ESPN promos for SC6 with Michael/Jemele. Work also appeared in the 1998 movie "Caught Up" starring Bokeem Woodbine and was included on the soundtrack.

Track listing

Chart positions

Weekly charts

Year-end charts

Singles
Chart positions from Billboard magazine

See also
 List of Billboard number-one R&B albums of 1998

References

1998 albums
Gang Starr albums
Albums produced by DJ Premier
Albums produced by Guru
Virgin Records albums